Dean Magraw is an American guitarist and composer.

Biography
Magraw was born in Minneapolis, Minnesota and grew up in St. Paul. He began playing guitar at the age of 13. Magraw performed in a duo for many years with Peter Ostroushko and has also performed with Tim Sparks, John Gorka and many other artists.

His musical spectrum ranges from world music band Boiled in Lead to jazz band Red Planet.

Discography

Solo
Broken Silence (1994) Red House
Kitchen Man (1997) Acoustic Music
Seventh One (1998) Red House
Heavy Meadow (2003) Acoustic Music
Celtic Hymns (2006) Lifescapes Music
Music For Healing (2007) Lifescapes
Foxfire (2008) CandyRat

With others
Duo (1991) Red House (with Peter Ostroushko)
Jaguar at Half Moon (1998) 
Raven (2006) Compass Records (with John Williams)
Unseen Rain (2007) CandyRat (with Jim Anton and JT Bates)
Silver (2008) (with Boiled in Lead)
Next (2008) (with Francois Corneloup)
Healing (2009) New Folk Records (with Bruce Kurnow)
Space Dust (2010) GoneJazz Records (with Red Planet)
How the Light Gets In (2010) Red House (with Marcus Wise)

References

External links
Dean Magraw official site

Living people
Musicians from Minneapolis
Guitarists from Minnesota
American male guitarists
Year of birth missing (living people)
Red House Records artists